Buchholzia is a genus of annelids belonging to the family Enchytraeidae.

The genus was first described by Michaelsen in 1886.

Species:
 Buchholzia appendiculata
 Buchholzia fallax

References

Annelids